The Diocese of Sankt Pölten is a diocese located in the city of Sankt Pölten in the Ecclesiastical province of Wien in Austria.

History
 January 28, 1785: Established as Diocese of Sankt Pölten from the Diocese of Passau, Germany and Diocese of Wiener Neustadt

Special churches
Minor Basilicas:
 Basilika Maria Taferl, Maria Taferl, Niederösterreich
 Basilika Unserer Lieben Frau, Geras, Niederösterreich 
 Hl. Dreifaltigkeit, Sonntagberg, Niederösterreich 
 Maria Dreieichen «ad tres Quercus», Dreieichen, Niederösterreich 
 Stift Lilienfeld, Lilienfeld, Niederösterreich

Leadership
 Bishops of Sankt Pölten (Roman rite)
 Bishop Alois Schwarz (since 2018.07.01)
 Bishop Klaus Küng (2004.10.07 - 2018.07.01)
 Bishop Kurt Krenn (1991.07.11 – 2004.10.07)
 Bishop Franz Žak (1961.10.01 – 1991.07.11)
 Bishop Michael Memelauer (1927.04.18 – 1961.09.30)
 Bishop Johannes Baptist Rößler (1894.01.05 – 1927.01.04)
 Bishop Matthäus Joseph Binder (1872.10.07 – 1893.08.14)
 Bishop Joseph Feßler (1864.09.23 – 1872.04.23)
 Bishop Ignaz Feigerle (1851.12.02 – 1863.09.27)
 Bishop Anton Alois Buchmayer (1842.12.28 – 1851.09.02)
 Bishop Michael Johann Wagner (1835.11.16 – 1842.10.23)
 Bishop Johann Michael Leonhard (1835.02.20 – 1835.11.19)
 Bishop Jakob Frint (1827.01.02 – 1834.10.11)
 Bishop Joseph Chrysostomus Pauer (1823.11.10 – 1826.12.19)
 Bishop Johann Nepomuk Ritter von Dankesreither (1816.06.30 – 1823.06.10)
 Bishop Godfried Joseph Crüts van Creits (1806.03.14 – 1815.04.05)
 Archbishop Sigismund Anton Graf von Hohenwart, S.J. (1794.01.10 – 1803.06.20)
 Bishop Johann Heinrich von Kerens, S.J. (1785.02.14 – 1792.11.26)

See also
Roman Catholicism in Austria

References

External links
 GCatholic.org 
 Catholic Hierarchy 
   Diocese website

 
Roman Catholic dioceses in Austria
Religious organizations established in 1785
Dioceses established in the 18th century
Sankt Pölten
Sankt Polten, Roman Catholic Diocese of